Khadkale is a census town in Pune district in the Indian state of Maharashtra.

Demographics
 India census, Khadkale had a population of 9792. Males constitute 52% of the population and females 48%. Khadkale has an average literacy rate of 70%, higher than the national average of 59.5%: male literacy is 77%, and female literacy is 62%. In Khadkale, 15% of the population is under 6 years of age.

References

Cities and towns in Pune district